Hipposyngnathus is an extinct genus of prehistoric ray-finned fish that lived during the early Oligocene epoch.

References

Gasterosteiformes
Oligocene fish